Jean and Jerry Friedman Shalhevet High School is a co-educational, college-preparatory, Modern Orthodox Jewish high school in Los Angeles, California.

Background information
The demographic breakdown of the 254 students enrolled in 2017-18 was approximately 98.4% white and 1.6% multiracial. The cost to attend Shalhevet is approximately $38,380, plus fees.

Activities
Shalhevet's school newspaper is The Boiling Point. It has won national awards from the National Scholastic Press Association, Columbia Scholastic Press Association, and Quill & Scroll International Honorary Journalism Society. The paper went through a structural reboot in 2010, and since then has seen an explosion in activity. The paper can publish up to 8 issues in a school year.

Controversy
On June 14th, 2017, Shalhevet caused a break between the more traditional wing of Modern Orthodox Judaism and its progressive faction by hiring Ramie Smith as a part of its Judaic Studies department. Smith had received semikhah (ordination) from Maharat, the first Orthodox Jewish institution to provide an ordination to women. She received semikhah in 2016. Head of School Ari Segal released a statement to respond to pushback, saying that "While we recognize this legitimate point of contention, at this juncture, our priority is focused squarely on the quality of our education. Ramie is a superstar, plain and simple." Incoming head of YULA Girls school Joshua Spodek protested on the grounds that this hiring was a break from Orthodox tradition, and that YULA Girls should be a feeder school for women's yeshivot.

Notable alumni
David Mazouz, actor

References

External links
 
 Official website dedicated for the Shalhevet Just Community
 Official newspaper website
 Satirical newspaper website

Educational institutions established in 1992
Modern Orthodox Jewish day schools in the United States
High schools in Los Angeles
Jewish day schools in California
Orthodox Judaism in Los Angeles
Private high schools in California
Private middle schools in California
1992 establishments in California